Vytautas Žiūra (born 11 May 1979) is an Austrian handball player for Handballclub Fivers Margareten and the Austrian national team.

He was born in Vienna to Lithuanian parents.

References

1979 births
Living people
Austrian male handball players
Sportspeople from Vilnius
Austrian people of Lithuanian descent
Lithuanian male handball players